Jean-Yves Berteloot (born 27 August 1958) is a French actor.

Theater

Filmography

References

External links 

1958 births
Living people
People from Saint-Omer
French male film actors
French male television actors
French male stage actors
20th-century French male actors
21st-century French male actors